Angern is a municipality in the Börde district in Saxony-Anhalt, Germany. On 1 January 2010 it absorbed the former municipalities Bertingen, Mahlwinkel and Wenddorf. The municipality consists of the Ortsteile (municipal divisions) Angern, Bertingen, Mahlwinkel, Wenddorf and Zibberick.

References

Municipalities in Saxony-Anhalt
Börde (district)